The 1997–98 FA Premier League (known as the FA Carling Premiership for sponsorship reasons) was the sixth season of the FA Premier League. It saw Arsenal lift their first league title since 1991 and, in so doing, became only the second team to win 'The Double' for the second time. 

It was Arsenal's first full season under French manager Arsène Wenger, who became the third manager to win the Premier League. Wenger followed in the footsteps of Alex Ferguson and Kenny Dalglish and, while both Ferguson and Dalglish were Scottish, Wenger was the first manager from outside the British Isles to win a league title in England.

Season summary
At the end of the 1997–98 FA Premier League season, a record total of nine English teams qualified for European competition.

Premiership champions Arsenal and runners-up Manchester United qualified for the Champions League, while UEFA Cup places went to Liverpool, Leeds United, Aston Villa and Blackburn Rovers. Qualifying for the UEFA Cup Winners' Cup were Chelsea (as defending champions) and FA Cup runners-up Newcastle United. Crystal Palace, while finishing bottom, qualified for the Intertoto Cup.

The gap between the Premier League and Division One of the Football League was highlighted at the end of 1997–98 when all three newly promoted teams were relegated. Crystal Palace were confined to bottom place in the final table having won just two home games all season. Barnsley's first season in the top division ended in relegation, although they did reach the FA Cup quarter finals and knock out Manchester United in the Fifth Round. Bolton Wanderers went down on goal difference, with 17th place being occupied by Everton: despite preserving top flight football there for the 45th season running, Howard Kendall quit as manager at Goodison Park after his third spell in charge.

Another mark of the gap was that the three relegated teams in the previous season took the top three places in the 1997–98 Football League. Had Sunderland not lost the play-off final to Charlton Athletic on penalty shootout, the 20 teams from 1998–99 Premier League would have been exactly the same as those in the 1996–97 Premier League.

Teams
Twenty teams competed in the league – the top seventeen teams from the previous season and the three teams promoted from the First Division. The promoted teams were Bolton Wanderers (returning to the top flight after a season's absence), Barnsley (playing in the top flight for the first time ever) and Crystal Palace (playing in the top flight again after a two-year absence). They replaced Sunderland, Middlesbrough and Nottingham Forest, who were relegated after top flight spells of one, two and three years respectively.

Stadiums and Locations

Personnel and kits
A list of personnel and kits of the clubs in the 1997–98 FA Premier League.

Managerial changes

League table

Results

Season statistics

Scoring

Top scorers

Hat-tricks 

Note: 4 Player scored 4 goals; P Player scored a perfect hat-trick; (H) – Home; (A) – Away

Top assists

Awards

Monthly awards

Annual awards

See also
1997–98 in English football

References and notes

External links
 1997–98 Premier League Season at RSSSF
 1997/98 FA Premier League Review

 
Premier League seasons
Eng
1997–98 in English football leagues